Brittlestem is a common name for several organisms and may refer to:

Mabrya acerifolia, a plant in the family Plantaginaceae, native to Arizona
Psathyrella, a genus of fungi
Psathyrotes, a genus of North American plants in the family Asteraceae
Pseudobahia heermannii, a species of plant endemic to California